(20 November 1883 – 4 April 1932) was a prominent Japanese architect who practiced in the early twentieth century. Okada taught at Waseda University and Tokyo School of Fine Arts. 

 
While he was well-known for tendency for European styles, he also produced work in the Imperial Crown style (帝冠様式, Teikanyōshiki). One example is the Biwako Otsukan in Yanagasaki Lakeside Park, Shiga Prefecture.

Biography
On November 20, 1883 Okada was born in Tokyo. In 1900 he graduated from a middle school attached to the Normal School, which is now Tsukuba University secondary school/high school. He graduated from Daiichi High School in 1903 and entered the Tokyo Institute of Technology Technical University. He graduated from university in 1906.

After graduation Okada became a lecturer at Tokyo School of Fine Arts. In 1911 he became a lecturer at Waseda University, and became a full professor a year later in 1912. In 1923 he became a full professor at Tokyo School of Fine Arts.

Okada won the first prize in a design competition for the Osaka City Central Public Hall in 1917. He designed the Tokyo Metropolitan Art Museum, a European classicist building with entrances on all four sides, which opened on 1 May 1926. He also designed Meiji Seimei Kan, which was completed in 1934.

Okada died on April 4, 1932.

Selected works
 Komatsu Miyauchi Hinoshito statue pedestal base (1912)
Bank of Japan Otaru Branch (1912) (currently a Financial Museum)
 Osaka City Central Public Hall (1917) Designed by Tatsuno Kataoka, based on Okada's original plan.
 Osaka Takashimaya (1921) Remodeled after war damage, demolished in 2007.
Hatoyama Ichiro House ( 1924 ) Currently Hatoyama Kaikan.
Kabukiza (1924) Restored after war damage but demolished in 2010.
 Aoyama Kaikan (1924). Constructed at the site of the residence of Suzumori Su-Feng.
Tokyo Metropolitan Art Museum ( 1926 ). Demolished after the completion of the present museum.
 Tokyo Prefectural First Higher Girls' School (1927).
 Kokokuin Bago (1927) Kanoeiji Temple.
 Kamakura National Treasure Hall (1928): The temple shrine of Kamakura was heavily damaged by the Great Kanto Earthquake and was re-built.
 Kuroda Memorial Hall (1928):(黒田記念館)
 Tokyo Prefectural First Junior High School (1929). Current municipal Hibiya High School.
 Tokyo Art School Showroom (1929) Current Tokyo National University of Fine Arts and Sciences Department of Art College Showroom.
 Nikolaito repair (1930) of design by Mikhail Stichlupov. 
 Hakuhodo (1930) Former headquarter building of the advertising agency. Demolished in 2010.
 Meiji Life Museum (1934)
 Lake Biwa Hotel (1934) Present Biwako Otsu pavilion.

References 

Imperial Crown Style architecture
Japanese architects
1883 births
1932 deaths